Ramnivas Rawat (born 21 January 1960) is an Indian politician serving as Madhya Pradesh Working President of the Indian National Congress 
. He started his political career in Indian Youth Congress and had been the five-time legislator from Vijaypur constituency in Madhya Pradesh Vijaypur (Vidhan Sabha constituency) and cabinet minister in the Government of Madhya Pradesh in Digvijaya Singh cabinet. He unsuccessfully contested for Indian parliament in 2019 against BJP leader Narendra Singh Tomar.

Personal life
Rawat was born on 21 January 1960 to Late Ganesh Prasad Rawat and Bhanti bai in Sunvai Tehsil in Vijaypur in Madhya Pradesh. He graduated with a Bachelor of Science degree and later earned a Masters with Gold Medal in History and LLB. Rawat is married to Uma Rawat, with whom he has two sons and two daughters.

Political career

Five Term MLA Rawat entered politics through Indian Youth Congress in 1986. He was first elected as MLA from Vijaypur in 1990 and then in 1993.  Rawat was inducted as Cabinet Minister in 1993 in Digvijay Singh cabinet. Subsequently, he won his elections from Vijaypur constituency in 2003, 2008 and 2013. 
In 2018 Assembly election, he lost to his nearest rival by 2890 votes from Vijaypur constituency. In 2019 Loksabha election, he contested against Narendra Singh Tomar and lost by 113341 votes from Morena.

Rawat is member of All Indian Congress Committee and working president of Madhya Pradesh Congress.

Political Views
He supports Congress Party's Ideology. It is a very astonishing fact about him whenever he is about to get a chance of being a minister he loses assembly elections.

References

See also

Madhya Pradesh Legislative Assembly
2013 Madhya Pradesh Legislative Assembly election
2008 Madhya Pradesh Legislative Assembly election

Indian National Congress politicians from Madhya Pradesh
Living people
Madhya Pradesh MLAs 2003–2008
1960 births